Unión Deportiva Tegueste is a football team based in Tegueste, in the Canary Islands. Founded in 1958, it plays in the Preferente de Tenerife. Its home stadium is Estadio Los Laureles with a capacity of 2,000 seats.

Season to season

5 seasons in Tercera División

External links
Preferente de Tenerife
Unofficial website

Football clubs in the Canary Islands
Sport in Tenerife
Association football clubs established in 1958
Divisiones Regionales de Fútbol clubs
1958 establishments in Spain